Urmas Eero Liiv (born 17 November 1966, in Tõstamaa, Pärnu County) is an Estonian film and television director.

2001-2012 he was the creative leader of the television channel Kanal 2. Since 2021 he is the creative leader of TV3's television channels.

Filmography
 "Must alpinist" 2015 (feature film)
 "Kiirtee põrgusse" 2019 (feature film)
 "Mimikri" 1999 (documentary film)
 "Inimene kadus" 2000 (documentary film)
 "Teine Arnold" 2002 (documentary film)
 "Kaali saladus" 2003 (documentary film)
 "Palju õnne!" 2004 (documentary film)
 "Casting" 2006 (documentary film)
 "Tervitusi Nõukogude Eestist!" 2007 (documentary film)
 "Pronksöö: vene mäss Tallinnas" 2007 (documentary film)
 "Staarmaakas" 2010 (documentary film)
 "Häädemeeste UFO" 2010 (documentary film)

References

Living people
1966 births
Estonian film directors
Tallinn University alumni
People from Tõstamaa